Charles Watts was an American Negro league second baseman in the 1920s.

Watts made his Negro leagues debut in 1924 with the St. Louis Stars. He played for the Stars for three seasons, and also played for the Cleveland Elites and Cleveland Hornets.

References

External links
 and Baseball-Reference Black Baseball Stats and Seamheads

Year of birth missing
Year of death missing
Place of birth missing
Place of death missing
Cleveland Elites players
Cleveland Hornets players
St. Louis Stars (baseball) players